Alexander Hunter was a unionist politician in Northern Ireland.

Hunter studied at the Belfast Royal Academy and Stranmillis Training College, then at Trinity College, Dublin, and Queen's University Belfast, before becoming a teacher.  He became active in the Ulster Unionist Party and was elected for Carrick, unopposed, in a by-election in 1950. He served until 1965, when he retired.  He was also active in the Orange Order, and was one of the leading voices of concern over constructing the new town of Craigavon.

References

Year of birth missing
Year of death missing
Alumni of Queen's University Belfast
Alumni of Trinity College Dublin
Members of the House of Commons of Northern Ireland 1949–1953
Members of the House of Commons of Northern Ireland 1953–1958
Members of the House of Commons of Northern Ireland 1958–1962
Members of the House of Commons of Northern Ireland 1962–1965
People educated at the Belfast Royal Academy
Members of the House of Commons of Northern Ireland for County Antrim constituencies
Ulster Unionist Party members of the House of Commons of Northern Ireland